Tom Lenihan (1908–1990) was a well known Irish traditional singer from Milltown Malbay, County Clare, Ireland.


Tom and Margaret Lenihan (born Vaughan) lived in a farmhouse in Knockbrack, a few miles outside Miltown Malbay. He was a farmer and the local butcher.

According to the sleevenotes of the CD Around the Hills of Clare:

Recordings

Solo albums
 Paddy's Panacea, 1978, Topic Records
 The Mount Callan Garland: songs from the repertoire of Tom Lenihan of Knockbrack, Miltown Malbay, county Clare. 1994. Collected and edited by Tom Munnelly with music transcriptions by Marian Deasy.Double cassette, accompanied by a book.

Anthologies
 Irish Voices, 1997, Topic
 Hurry The Jug, 1996, Globestyle
 Come All My Lads that Follow The Plough (Voice of the People Vol 5), 1998, Topic
 They Ordered Their Pints of Beer and Sherry, 1998, Topic (only one song)
 As Me and My Love Sat Courting: Songs of Love (Voice of the People Vol 15), 1998, Topic (only one song)
 Around the Hills of Clare

Unpublished
 Recordings made by Tom Munnelly about folklore. Made on behalf of the Department of Irish Folklore, University College Dublin.

References

External links
 Photo 
 Recordings of Tom Lenihan from the Carroll Mackenzie Collection on the Clare County Library website

1908 births
1990 deaths
Musicians from County Clare
Irish folk singers
20th-century Irish  male singers
People from Milltown Malbay
Topic Records artists